Chris Ioan Roberts (born 24 April 1985) is an Australian-born actor, writer and director working in London.

Biography 

Chris Ioan Roberts is a graduate of the Victorian College of the Arts (Bachelor of Dramatic Art, 2010) and is an alumnus of the Watermill Centre, New York, where he worked with celebrated American avant-garde director Robert Wilson. Whilst at the VCA he was the recipient of the Friends of VCA Award for his residency in New York. He trained originally as a ballet dancer.

He began professional international secondment as Creative Associate under Giuseppe Frigeni at the Opéra national de Paris on Robert Wilson’s production of Madama Butterfly in 2011.

His theatre work is known for its subversion, shock humour and political undercurrent as well as for its highly formal and often chaotic aesthetic.

He lives in London.

Collaborators 

Roberts is noted for his international focus as a theatre-maker and has most notably collaborated with London’s Ovalhouse, writing, directing and performing in his play Dead Royal in 2015 as Wallis Simpson and Diana Spencer which was re-commissioned following a 2014 work-in-progress season. The work was subsequently invited to the Brisbane Festival.

Other collaborations and appearances include work with Jia-Jen Lin (New York), MKA: Theatre of New Writing (Berlin), La MaMa (New York) and Daniel Schlusser.

References

External links 
 http://www.chrisioanroberts.com
 http://www.au.timeout.com/melbourne/theatre/events/1158/crossed?DCMP=OTC-RSS-
 https://web.archive.org/web/20160326140733/https://www.stmichaels.vic.edu.au/2015/04/16/ascendant-chris-ioan-roberts/
 http://www.londoncitynights.com/2015/04/dead-royal-at-ovalhouse-22nd-april-2015.html

Australian male stage actors
Living people
1985 births
21st-century Australian male actors